Girls Go Wild is the alternate (and incorrect) title of the 1979 debut studio album by the Texas-based blues rock band The Fabulous Thunderbirds. The album was an eponymous release (the record label and the jacket spine have only the band's name), but due to the prominence of the words "Girls Go Wild" on the cover it has often been referred to by that name.  The album was reissued via Benchmark Recordings in 2000.

Reception
The Cleveland Scene wrote that the album "generated an excitement among many blues fans on a par with that brought on by the first couple of Paul Butterfield albums more than a decade before."

Track listing 
All tracks composed by Kim Wilson except where indicated:
 "Wait on Time" – 3:03
 "Scratch My Back" (James Moore AKA Slim Harpo) – 3:52
 "Rich Woman" (Dorothy LaBostrie, McKinley "Li'l" Millet) – 3:28
 "Full-Time Lover" (Frankie Lee, Frank Scott) – 4:43
 "Pocket Rocket" – 3:27
 "She's Tuff" (Jerry "Boogie" McCain) – 2:59
 "Marked Deck" (Jimmy Mullins, Johnny Vincent) – 2:41
 "Walkin' to My Baby" – 2:25 
 "Rock with Me" – 2:38
 "C-Boy's Blues" (Wilson, Jimmie Vaughan, Keith Ferguson, Mike Buck) – 2:58
 "Let Me In" – 2:35

Bonus tracks on some editions
 "Look Whatcha Done" (Samuel Maghett) – 2:17
 "Please Don't Lie to Me" – 2:08
 "Things I Forgot to Do" (Kim Wilson, Guitar Slim) – 3:00

Personnel

Musicians
Kim Wilson – vocals, harmonica
Jimmie Vaughan – guitar
Keith Ferguson – bass
Mike Buck – drums

Technical
 Denny Bruce – producer
 Bob Sullivan – engineer

References

External links
Official Site

1979 debut albums
The Fabulous Thunderbirds albums
Chrysalis Records albums
Albums produced by Denny Bruce